The 2006–07 KFC Twenty20 Big Bash was the second season of official Twenty20 domestic cricket in Australia.  Six teams representing six states in Australia participated in the competition.  The competition was won by the Victorian Bushrangers for the second time after they defeated the Tasmanian Tigers at the Melbourne Cricket Ground.

Table

Teams receive 2 points for a win, 1 for a tie or no result, and 0 for a loss.

Teams

Fixtures

Final

References

CricInfo – 2006–07 Australian Twenty20 scorecards

KFC Twenty20 Big Bash seasons
KFC Twenty20 Big Bash
KFC Twenty20 Big Bash